The 2007 ICF Canoe Slalom World Championships were held in Foz do Iguaçu, Brazil under the auspices of International Canoe Federation. It was the 31st edition.

Medal summary

Men's

Canoe

Kayak

Women's

Kayak

Medal table

References
Official results
International Canoe Federation

Canoe Slalom World Championships
World Canoe Slalom Championships
ICF Canoe Slalom World Championships
Canoe
Canoeing and kayaking competitions in Brazil
September 2007 sports events in South America